Charalampos Tsoulfas (born 2 July 2000) is a Greek professional footballer who plays as a goalkeeper for Greek side Ifestos Peristeri.

References

2000 births
Living people
Greek footballers
Greek expatriate footballers
Serie D players
Super League Greece 2 players
S.E.F. Torres 1903 players
Apollon Smyrnis F.C. players
Akritas Chlorakas players
Association football goalkeepers